Zhuo Wenjun (fl. 2nd century BC) was a Chinese poet of the Western Han dynasty.  As a young widow, she eloped with the poet Sima Xiangru. The poem Baitou Yin (白頭吟, White-Haired Lament) which complains at the inconstancy of male love, is attributed to her.

Biography
Zhuo Wenjun was a lady from the Zhuo family of the Sichuan province, and her father was Zhuo Wangsun. She had the best education, highlighting music and poetry. Married at sixteen, she was soon widowed and returned to her parents. Sima Xiangru, a famous poet and musician, during a stay in Chengdu, was invited to their home by the Zhuos. Zhuo Wenjun fell in love with him when she saw him play the guqin and did not hesitate to run away with him. Angry, her father denied her any support. Finding herself in poverty because her new husband's family was not rich, Zhuo Wenjun opened a wine shop. Ashamed that his daughter was a simple innkeeper, her father relented and gave them money and servants.

Emperor Wu learned of Sima Xiangru's talent and offered him an official cargo in the capital. There, Sima distanced himself not only physically from his wife, but also wrote her a letter informing her of his intent to take a concubine. Saddened, Zhuo Wenjun replied with a long poem that moved him so deeply that he was ashamed of his plan and returned with her, living together until their old age. When he died, she composed a funeral ode in his honor.

Popular media

She is portrayed by Park Si-yeon in the 2004 Chinese television series Feng Qiu Huang.

References

Sources
 Zhuo Wenjun: A woman of great courage and wisdom

Han dynasty poets
Chinese women poets
1st-century BC Chinese women writers
1st-century BC writers
1st-century BC Chinese poets
Year of birth unknown
Year of death unknown
2nd-century BC Chinese women writers
2nd-century BC Chinese writers
2nd-century BC writers
Writers from Chengdu
2nd-century BC Chinese people
1st-century BC Chinese people
2nd-century BC Chinese women
Poets from Sichuan
1st-century BC Chinese women